Javier Eduardo Toyo Bárcenas (born 12 October 1977, in Caracas) is a Venezuelan football goalkeeper currently playing for Club Barcelona Atlético.  He is a member of the Venezuela national football team.

Professional club career

Toyo began playing football for the youth squad of Primera División Venezolana club Caracas FC and signed a professional contract with the club in 1998.  After the 1998-99 season, he joined Atlético El Vigía Fútbol Club for one season before returning to Caracas FC.

Toyo played the following six seasons for Caracas FC primarily as the starting goalkeeper, appearing in over 200 league matches. In December 2007, Toyo transferred to Colombian club Atlético Bucaramanga, where he was primarily an unused substitute. After only a few months in Colombia, he returned to Caracas FC to get more first team football and signed a new contract through 2009.

Toyo participated in the Copa Libertadores 2007 with Caracas FC, and was noted for a strong performance in the match which sealed their progression to the round of 16, a 3–1 victory against Argentine club River Plate on 6 April 2007.

National team career

Toyo made his first appearance for the Venezuela national football team as a second-half substitute in a friendly match against Jamaica on 28 April 2004. Toyo has appeared in 10 international matches for Venezuela from 2004 through 2008.

Toyo was a member of the Venezuelan team at the Copa América 2007. He was an unused substitute in all four of Venezuela's matches.

References

1977 births
Living people
Footballers from Caracas
Venezuelan footballers
Association football goalkeepers
Venezuelan Primera División players
Categoría Primera A players
Caracas FC players
Atlético Bucaramanga footballers
Real Esppor Club players
Atlético Venezuela C.F. players
Metropolitanos FC players
Liga Dominicana de Fútbol players
Club Barcelona Atlético players
Venezuela international footballers
2007 Copa América players
Venezuelan expatriate footballers
Venezuelan expatriate sportspeople in Colombia
Venezuelan expatriate sportspeople in the Dominican Republic
Expatriate footballers in Colombia
Expatriate footballers in the Dominican Republic